Ronald Alan "Ron" Naslund (born February 28, 1943 in Minneapolis, Minnesota) is an ice hockey player who played for the American national team. He won a silver medal at the 1972 Winter Olympics. He played collegiate hockey at the University of Denver.

References

External links

1943 births
American men's ice hockey right wingers
Ice hockey people from Minneapolis
Ice hockey players at the 1972 Winter Olympics
Living people
Medalists at the 1972 Winter Olympics
Olympic silver medalists for the United States in ice hockey
Denver Pioneers men's ice hockey players